Macbie Hill railway station served the hamlet of Coalyburn, Peeblesshire, Scotland, from 1864 to 1933 on the Leadburn, Linton and Dolphinton Railway.

History 
The station opened as Coalyburn on 4 July 1864 by the Leadburn, Linton and Dolphinton Railway. The Coalyburn mines were to the north as well as quarries, some to the south. The station's name was changed to Coalyburn (Macbie Hill) in the timetables in October 1872, but it was officially changed to Macbie Hill on 25 May 1874, being named after the local Macbiehill House. There was a station building on the north side of the line and opposite this was a goods siding. The station became an unstaffed halt on 1 December 1930 and closed on 1 April 1933.

References

External links 
Railscot - Macbie Hill

Disused railway stations in the Scottish Borders
Railway stations in Great Britain opened in 1864
Railway stations in Great Britain closed in 1933
1864 establishments in Scotland
1933 disestablishments in Scotland